Kishoreganj is an upazila of Nilphamari District in the Division of Rangpur, Bangladesh.

History
The upazila was named after Prince Kishore Chandro, son of Horish Chandro (1800–1900). Kishorganj was known for Nil cultivation while under British ruling. It was part of Rangpur District and later separated and merged with Nilphamati district in 1983.

Geography
It has a total area of 264.98 km2. The upazila is bounded by Jaldhaka upazila on the north, Taraganj upazila on the south, Gangachara upazila on the east, Nilphamari sadar and Saidpur upazilas on the west.

Demographics

According to the 2011 Bangladesh census, Kishoreganj Upazila had 65,798 households and a population of 261,069, 3.2% of whom lived in urban areas. 11.0% of the population was under the age of 5. The literacy rate (age 7 and over) was 38.5%, compared to the national average of 51.8%.

Economy
The fertile land of Kishoreganj produces mainly potato, rice, ginger and corn. The season's first Potato harvest happens here and transported to all main cities at the beginning of December.

Administration
Kishoreganj Thana, now an upazila, was formed in 1921.

Kishoreganj Upazila is divided into nine union parishads: Bahagili, Barabhita, Chandkhana, Garagram, Kishoreganj, Magura, Nitai, Putimari, and Ranachandi. The union parishads are subdivided into 51 mauzas and 53 villages.

See also
Upazilas of Bangladesh
Districts of Bangladesh
Divisions of Bangladesh

References

Upazilas of Nilphamari District